Poet's Pub is a 1949 British comedy film directed by Frederick Wilson and starring Derek Bond, Rona Anderson and James Robertson Justice. It is based on the 1929 novel of the same title by Eric Linklater. The film was one of four of David Rawnsley's Aquila Films that used his proposed "independent frame" technique. It was made at Pinewood Studios.

Premise
An Oxford poet is persuaded to become manager of the Pelican Pub, after complaining about the food and service.

Cast

Production
The film features actors viewing a combined radiogram television receiver made by Alba in 1948.

External links

 

1949 films
1949 comedy films
Films shot at Pinewood Studios
Films based on British novels
British comedy films
British black-and-white films
Films scored by Clifton Parker
Films set in England
Films set in London
1940s English-language films
1940s British films